Since the publication of To Kill a Mockingbird in 1960, there have been many references and allusions to it in popular culture. The book has been internationally popular for more than a half century, selling more than 30 million copies in 40 languages. It currently (2013) sells 750,000 copies a year and is widely read in schools in America and abroad.
Harper Lee and her publisher did not expect To Kill a Mockingbird to be such a huge success. Since it was first published in 1960, it has sold close to one million copies a year and has been the second-best-selling backlist title in the United States. Whether they like the book or not, readers can remember when and where they were the first time they opened the book. Because of this, Mockingbird has become a pillar for students around the country and symbol of justice and the reminiscence of childhood.
To Kill a Mockingbird is not solely about the cultural legal practices of Atticus Finch, but about the fatherly virtues he held towards his children and the way Scout viewed him as a father.

Parties were held across the United States for the 50th anniversary of publication in 2010.
In honor of the 50th anniversary, famous authors and celebrities as well as people close to the book's author, Harper Lee, shared their experiences with To Kill a Mockingbird in the book Scout, Atticus, & Boo: A Celebration of Fifty Years of To Kill a Mockingbird.  The book features interviews with Mary Badham, Tom Brokaw, Oprah Winfrey, Anna Quindlen, Richard Russo, as well as Harper Lee's sister, Alice Finch Lee.

The 2010 documentary film Hey, Boo: Harper Lee & To Kill a Mockingbird focuses on the background of the book and the film as well as their impact on readers and viewers.

Films
 In the 1993 movie Benny and Joon, Joon (Mary Stuart Masterson) tells Sam (Johnny Depp) when she catches him staring at her, "Having a Boo Radley moment, are we?"

 In the 1997 movie The Game, main character Nicholas van Orten (Michael Douglas) keeps a loaded gun in a copy of the book. 
 In the 2007 film Freedom Writers, Hilary Swank's, character, Erin Gruwell, says to her husband when they speak about her father, "He was like Atticus Finch to me when I was growing up..."
 In Cameron Crowe's 2000 film Almost Famous, the young William Miller and his mother Elaine have just viewed the 1962 film and discuss it as they stroll along the street.
 The 2006 film Failure to Launch contains a subplot about killing a mockingbird. The book is specifically mentioned in the gun shop scene.
 In the 2002 film Mr. Deeds, Winona Ryder's character, Babe Bennett, alludes to Boo Radley in an attempt to lie about her past. When Babe goes into a building, she says hello to "Mrs. Finch and her pet Atticus", a reference to Atticus Finch.
 In the film Vanilla Sky, the movie is on the screen in the background of the security room in David Aames', played by Tom Cruise, cell. Atticus Finch is also revealed to be the inspiration for Dr. Curtis McCabe, played by Kurt Russell.
 In the 2005 film Capote, Truman Capote is invited to the publication party for the novel.
 In the 2006 film Cashback, insomniac Ben Willis reads the novel when he can't fall asleep at night.
 In the 2000 film All Roads Lead Home, the dog on the farm is named Atticus. The film also is a parody of the novel.
 In the 2011 film Bad Teacher, this novel is used as one of the learning materials in the English class.
 In the 2012 film The Perks of Being a Wallflower, this novel is studied in the English class.
 In the 2012 film Broken, Archie and Skunk mirror Atticus and Scout in many ways. Like Atticus, Archie is a highly principled lawyer, and Skunk has many of Scout's qualities, such as honesty, intelligence and charm. However, despite the similarities in characterisation, Broken does not involve any exploration of prejudice and hate.
 In the 2013 film Beautiful Creatures, the novel is studied in class. It is also frequently mentioned in the novel of the same name on which the movie was based, often referring to Macon Ravenwood as Boo Radley.
 In the 2019 film Just Mercy, there are multiple explicit references to the novel, the real-life story is coincidentally set in the same city of Monroeville, Alabama, and the plot involves hauntingly similar elements (African-American man falsely accused and unjustly convicted of a crime against a white woman).

Television
 Get Smart episode 16 of season 4 first aired on January 18, 1969 was entitled "Tequila Mockingbird".
 An episode of the American situation comedy Frasier was titled "To Kill a Talking Bird".
 To Kill a Mockingbird was featured in an episode of the comedic educational literature series Thug Notes.
 In the show Awkward, Sadie references To Kill a Mockingbird by constantly calling Austin Welch, Boo Radley.
 In the episode "Mountain Wedding" of The Andy Griffith Show, Dud Wash says that Ernest T. Bass' cousin said that Bass "went off into the woods to kill a mockingbird", to which Andy Taylor responds, "He doesn't sound like a very nice person."
 In the Smallville episode "Hug", Lex compares Clark to Atticus Finch because of his altruism.
 In the Power Rangers Jungle Fury episode "Path of the Righteous",  Rhino Ranger Dominic "Dom" Hargan is seen reading a copy of the book.
 In season 13 of Degrassi, the Grade Tens are studying To Kill a Mockingbird in their English class and in episode 39, "Thunderstruck", Miles acts it out for a game of charades.
 In the episode "Point Three Percent" of The Good Doctor,  Shaun reads To Kill a Mockingbird to a young patient.
 In Ms. Hammurabi, the main character often reads this book.
 In the Robot Chicken episode "Cannot Be Erased, So Sorry", a student gives his book report on To Kill a Mockingbird. Atticus, Scout and Jem are reimagined as superheroes battling the supervillain "Mockingbird".
 In The Simpsons episode "Jaws Wired Shut", the Simpson family visits a movie theater. One preview shown is a public service announcement by The Itchy & Scratchy Show about turning off phones in the theater. Its title, "To Kill a Talking Bird", is a play on the name of To Kill a Mockingbird.
 In one of his shows, the US comedian and TV host Stephen Colbert acted as a lawyer styled as Gregory Peck in the movie To Kill a Mockingbird demanding the release of a man who compared the Turkish President to Gollum.

Comics
 In the comic strip Get Fuzzy, Bucky the cat begins to read the book, before his owner Rob explains that it is not "a how-to manual."
 In DC Comics continuity, it has been established that To Kill a Mockingbird is Superman's favorite book and movie.
 In the comic strips Bloom County, Outland, and Opus, Opus the penguin is frequently seen reading To Kill a Mockingbird and has stated he rereads it every summer. In the comic strip, a fictional movie was created entitled Kill Mo' Mockingbird.
 In the webcomic Angel Moxie, comic 511, Tristan is seen reading To Kill a Mockingbird. When asked about it, she calls the book How To Kill A Mockingbird.  After Alex explains the correct title, Tristan remarks, 'That explains the lack of step-by-step instructions.'  She is shown reading the book again in comic 610.
 In the 1998 comic strip, Tubularman, Ross Wainright (aka Tubularman) decides to download someone else's book report instead of completing his own book report on To Kill A Mockingbird.

Music
 The character of Dill gave his name to the Derby indie-punk band The Charles Baker Harrises.
 The character of Boo Radley gave his name to the British band The Boo Radleys.
 The Knoxville, Tennessee-based rock band Atticus was inspired by To Kill a Mockingbird.
 The name of the Temecula, California based band Finch (American band) was inspired by To Kill a Mockingbird.
 In 2001, Blink-182 band members Mark Hoppus and Tom Delonge created the clothing line Atticus Clothing, named after the character in this book. Similarly, the female line of the brand is called Scout. The brand's logo is a dead bird.
 Bruce Hornsby wrote a song called "Sneaking Up on Boo Radley," which describes the kids' adventures and reactions with regard to their neighbor Boo.  The end of the song suggests that it is written from Jem's point of view.  The song can be found on the 1998 studio album Spirit Trail and the live album Here Come the Noise Makers, which was released in 2000.
 The Noisettes song "Atticus" is inspired by To Kill a Mockingbird.
 The Paint It Black song "Atticus Finch" is inspired by To Kill a Mockingbird.
 The Kendrick Lamar album's title To Pimp a Butterfly is inspired by To Kill a Mockingbird.
 A Canadian gypsy-folk band call themselves The Tequila Mockingbird Orchestra.
 A pop-punk band from Upstate New York is named "Atticus Finch" after the main character, even having a song about the events of To Kill a Mockingbird called "Believe Tom Robinson".

References

Bibliography
Murphy, Mary McDonagh.  Scout, Atticus & Boo: A Celebration of Fifty Years of To Kill a Mockingbird. HarperCollins: 2010.

External links
Scout, Atticus & Boo: A Celebration of Fifty Years of To Kill a Mockingbird

Novels in popular culture
Popular Culture